Keeper of the Privy Seal may refer to:
Keeper of the Privy Seal of Ireland
Keeper of the Privy Seal of Scotland
Lord Keeper of the Privy Seal of Japan
Lord Privy Seal, Lord Keeper of the Privy Seal of the United Kingdom

See also
 "Lord Privy Seal" (term)
 Privy seal